Škoda Š-I-j was a tankete developed by Škoda company for Yugoslavia. Only one prototype was ever created, The Yugoslavian Royal Army decided against ordering production of this vehicle.
In the Š in name stands for Škoda, I or one in roman refers to category of vehicle(I for tankette, II for light tank, III for medium tank).

References 

Light tanks of the interwar period
Tanks of Czechoslovakia
Cavalry tanks
World War II light tanks